Róbert Huna (born 9 March 1985) is a Slovak professional ice hockey player who currently playing for HK Levice of the Slovak 1. Liga.

He previously played for HC Slovan Bratislava, MsHK Žilina and HC Košice. He also played for Yertis Pavlodar of the Kazakhstan Hockey Championship. He is the twin brother of Richard Huna and the two have often been teammates together. He is also the younger brother of Rudolf Huna.

Career statistics

Regular season and playoffs

References

External links

1985 births
Living people
HC Košice players
MHk 32 Liptovský Mikuláš players
Sportspeople from Liptovský Mikuláš
HC Slovan Bratislava players
Slovak ice hockey centres
Yertis Pavlodar players
MsHK Žilina players
HK Poprad players
HK Levice players
HC '05 Banská Bystrica players
Slovak twins
Twin sportspeople
Expatriate ice hockey players in Kazakhstan
Slovak expatriate ice hockey people
Slovak expatriate sportspeople in Kazakhstan